Holybourne Freight railway station is where freight trains serving Holybourne Oil Terminal terminate. These freight trains ran daily from Bentley and Alton. Because the line is single-track between Bentley and Alton for a small amount of the way, when a freight train needs to go to there, one of the normal passenger trains terminates at Farnham, or occasionally Aldershot.

The nearest passenger railway station is Bentley.

References

Railway stations in Hampshire